Swayamvara  is a 2010 Indian Kannada-language film directed by R Anantharaju, starring Diganth, Srinagara Kitty and Sharmiela Mandre in lead roles.

Plot

Cast

 Diganth as Vijay
 Srinagara Kitty as Ajay
 Sharmiela Mandre as Anu
 Rangayana Raghu as Col Kenchappa
 Sudha Belawadi 
 M. N. Lakshmi Devi 
 Ramesh Bhat 
 M. S. Umesh 
 Tennis Krishna 
 Harish Rai

Music

Reception 
A critic from The New Indian Express wrote "Almost all the character artists have performed well in the film. H.C. Venu has done a good job behind camera.  "Swayamvara" is an average fare and is worth just a one-time watch". B S Srivani from Deccan Herald wrote "Kitti is up to the task. Sharmila is restrained and oozing glamour wherever required. Having perfected the art of grating on the nerves in other films, the dimpled actor manages to pull off inane jokes easily.  ‘Swayamvara’ is a nice title for a less-than-nice film". Shruti Indira Lakshminarayana from Rediff.com scored the film at 2.5 out of 5 stars and says "Dialogues don't have much punch, and despite all the songs being original scores and big names like Yograj Bhatt, Nagendra Prasad, Sudhir Athawar, Arjun and Tushar Ranganath writing the lyrics, Manikanth Kadri's music is not catchy. The film also seems a tad too lengthy". A critic from Bangalore Mirror wrote "All the actors churn out decent performances. Rangayana Raghu whose character is at the receiving end of Kitty’s mis-directed efforts to woo Sharmila is fun to watch. Sharmila oozes glamour and her eye candy image is worth the trip to the cinema hall".

References

2010s Kannada-language films
2010 films